Gladys Maria Knight (born May 28, 1944), known as the "Empress of Soul", is an American singer, songwriter, actress and businesswoman. A seven-time Grammy Award-winner, Knight recorded hits through the 1960s, 1970s, and 1980s with her family group Gladys Knight & the Pips, which included her brother Merald "Bubba" Knight and cousins William Guest and Edward Patten.

Knight has recorded two number-one Billboard Hot 100 singles ("Midnight Train to Georgia" and "That's What Friends Are For" which she did with Dionne Warwick, Sir Elton John and Stevie Wonder), eleven number-one R&B singles and six number-one R&B albums. She has won seven Grammy Awards (four as a solo artist and three with the Pips) and is an inductee into the Rock and Roll Hall of Fame and Vocal Group Hall of Fame along with The Pips. Two of her songs ("I Heard It Through the Grapevine" and "Midnight Train to Georgia") were inducted into the Grammy Hall of Fame for "historical, artistic and significant" value.  She also recorded the theme song for the 1989 James Bond film Licence to Kill. Rolling Stone magazine ranked Knight among the 100 Greatest Singers of All Time.

Early life
Knight was born in Atlanta to Merald Woodlow Knight Sr., a postal worker, and Sarah Elizabeth (née Woods). She has an older sister, Brenda, one living brother, Merald "Bubba" Jr. and one deceased brother, David. Throughout the late 1940s and early 1950s, she sang in the church choir. She won Ted Mack's The Original Amateur Hour TV show contest at the age of eight in 1952. That same year, Gladys, her brother Bubba, sister Brenda, and their cousins Eleanor and William Guest began performing together during Bubba's tenth birthday party after a record player malfunctioned. Soon the quintet agreed to form a group at the insistence of Gladys' mother Elizabeth Knight. 

They settled on the name The Pips, inspired by the nickname of their cousin James "Pip" Woods. By 1955, the group entered the talent show circuit in their hometown of Atlanta, winning each talent show they entered. Their success brought them a record contract with Brunswick Records in 1957. At Brunswick, the group released two recordings that failed to chart. Despite this, the group was now opening for top R&B acts such as Jackie Wilson and Sam Cooke. By 1959, Brunswick dropped the group, and both Brenda Knight and Eleanor Guest left The Pips to begin families. They were replaced by another cousin, Edward Patten, and a friend, Langston George.

In 1961, they recorded the Johnny Otis–penned "Every Beat of My Heart". Lacking a record label, a local Atlanta label, Huntom Records, pushed the single and got a distribution deal with Vee-Jay Records to release it. The group moved to New York, where they auditioned for Bobby Robinson's Fury Records. Upon learning that "Every Beat of My Heart" was already becoming a hit but had cut the group out of profits, Robinson had The Pips re-record the song and release it on Fury Records. Both versions made the Billboard charts, with the Huntom/Vee-Jay version reaching number six on the Billboard Hot 100. Prior to the re-release on Fury Records, the group changed their name to Gladys Knight & the Pips. 

Later in 1961, the quintet released the single "Letter Full of Tears", which became another top-40 hit in early 1962.  After releasing a string of singles on Fury Records, Langston George left the group in 1962.  That same year, Knight left the group to start a family with musician and husband Jimmy Newman. In 1964, she returned to the group, and they signed with Larry Maxwell's Maxx label, releasing several modest hits produced by Van McCoy, including "Lovers Always Forgive" and the original version of "Giving Up".  Other songs they released on Maxx include "(There Will Never Be) Another Love", "Either Way I Lose", "Go Away, Stay Away", "Maybe Maybe Baby", "Stop and Get a Hold of Myself", "Who Knows" and "If I Should Ever Fall in Love".

Success with the Pips

Gladys Knight & the Pips joined the Motown Records roster in 1966 (while the band had no "sure hit"), and, although initially regarded as a second-string act by the label, scored several major hit singles, including "I Heard It Through the Grapevine" (1967) (released later by Marvin Gaye), "Take Me in Your Arms and Love Me" (1967), "The Nitty Gritty" (1969), "Friendship Train" (1969), "If I Were Your Woman" (1970), "I Don't Want To Do Wrong" (1971), the Grammy Award–winning "Neither One of Us (Wants to Be the First to Say Goodbye)" (1972), and "Daddy Could Swear (I Declare)" (1973). In their early Motown career, Gladys Knight and the Pips toured as the opening act for Diana Ross and The Supremes. Gladys Knight stated in her memoirs that Ross kicked her off the tour because the audience's reception to Knight's soulful performance overshadowed her. Berry Gordy later told Knight that she was giving his act a hard time.

The act left Motown for a better deal with Buddah Records in 1973, and achieved even greater mainstream success that year with hits such as the Grammy-winning "Midnight Train to Georgia" (#1 on the pop and R&B chart), "I've Got to Use My Imagination", "The Way We Were/Try To Remember" and "Best Thing That Ever Happened to Me". In the summer of 1974, Knight and the Pips recorded the soundtrack to the film Claudine with producer Curtis Mayfield, which included the songs "On and On", "The Makings of You" and "Make Yours a Happy Home". 

The act was particularly successful in Europe, and especially the United Kingdom. A number of the Buddah singles became hits in the UK several years after their release in the US. For example, "Midnight Train to Georgia" hit the Top 5 of the UK singles chart in the summer of 1976, a full three years after its success in the U.S.

During this period of high profile, Knight acted in the film Pipe Dreams, a romantic drama set in Alaska. The film failed at the box-office, but Knight did receive a Golden Globe Best New Actress nomination.

Knight and the Pips continued to have hits until the late 1970s, when they were forced to record separately due to legal issues, resulting in Knight's first solo LP recordings—Miss Gladys Knight (1978) on Buddah and Gladys Knight (1979) on Columbia Records. After divorcing James Newman II in 1973, Knight married Barry Hankerson (uncle of future hip/hop, R&B singer Aaliyah), then Detroit mayor Coleman Young's executive aide. Knight and Hankerson remained married for four years, during which time they had a son, Shanga Ali. Hankerson and Knight became embroiled in a heated custody battle over Shanga Ali.

In 1980, Johnny Mathis invited Knight to record two duets—"When A Child Is Born" (previously a hit for Mathis) and "The Lord's Prayer".

Signing with Columbia Records in 1980 and restored to its familiar quartet form, Gladys Knight & the Pips began releasing new material. The act enlisted former Motown producers Nickolas Ashford and Valerie Simpson for their first two albums: About Love (1980), which included the hit "Landlord" and Touch (1981).

In 1983, Gladys Knight and the Pips scored again with the hit "Save the Overtime (For Me)". The song, under the artistic direction of Leon Sylvers III (known for collaborating on Shalamar hits), was done in a soulful boogie style. The single was released from their LP "Visions" and reached number sixty-six on the Hot 100, but was more successful on the R&B where it hit number one for a single week in mid 1983. The single was the first time the group hit number one on the R&B chart since 1974. The video accompanying the song became among the earliest R&B videos to incorporate elements of hip hop culture.  The album also included the R&B hit "You're Number One (In My Book)".  During this period, Knight kicked a gambling addiction to the game baccarat.

In 1987, Knight decided to pursue a solo career, and she and the Pips recorded their final LP together, All Our Love (1987), for MCA Records. Its infectious lead single, "Love Overboard", was a number-one R&B hit and won another Grammy for the act as well. After a successful 1988 tour, the Pips retired and Knight began her solo career. Gladys Knight & the Pips were inducted into the Georgia Music Hall of Fame in 1989, into the Rock and Roll Hall of Fame in 1996 and the Vocal Group Hall of Fame in 2001.

Solo music career
While still with the Pips, Gladys Knight joined with Dionne Warwick, Stevie Wonder, and Elton John on the 1985 AIDS benefit single, "That's What Friends Are For", a triple No. 1 mega-hit, which won a Grammy for Best Pop Performance By A Duo Or Group With Vocal.

Knight shared a stage with Dionne Warwick and Patti LaBelle for the 1986 HBO special Sisters in the Name of Love. On March 27, 1988, Knight performed a rendition of "America the Beautiful" at Wrestlemania 4 in Atlantic City, NJ. In 1989, she recorded "Licence to Kill", the title track for James Bond film of the same name, a Top-10 hit in the UK and Germany.

Knight released her third and most successful solo LP, Good Woman, on MCA in 1991, which hit No. 1 on the R&B album chart, featured the No. 2 R&B hit "Men", and reached No. 45 on the main Billboard album chart—her all-time-highest showing. The album also featured "Superwoman", written by Babyface and featuring Dionne Warwick and Patti LaBelle; the track was nominated for a Grammy. Knight and LaBelle collaborated the same year on "I Don't Do Duets", for LaBelle's album Burnin'.  Also in 1991, Knight performed the national anthem at Game 1 of the World Series.

Her fourth solo album, Just for You, went Gold and was nominated for the 1995 Grammy Award for Best R&B Album.

Knight created and now directs the Mormon-themed choir Saints Unified Voices. SUV has released a Grammy Award-winning CD titled One Voice, and occasionally performs at LDS church firesides.

In April 2004, Knight co-headlined the VH1's benefit concert Divas Live 2004 alongside Ashanti, Cyndi Lauper, Jessica Simpson, Joss Stone, Debbie Harry, and Patti LaBelle, in support of the Save the Music Foundation.

In 2005 a duet between Knight and Ray Charles of "You Were There" was released on Charles' duets album Genius & Friends.

In the spring of 2008, Knight appeared alongside Chaka Khan, Patti LaBelle and Diana Ross at the 'Divas with Heart' concert in aid of cardiac research, at New York's Radio City Hall. Also in 2008 Gladys, Jack Black, Robert Downey Jr. and Ben Stiller performed on American Idol to raise money for charity.

In 2009 Knight sang "His Eye Is On The Sparrow" and "The Lord's Prayer" at the funeral service for Michael Jackson.

In March 2010, Randy Jackson mentioned on a new episode of the same show that he is back in the studio with Gladys Knight working on a new album. In December 2010, Knight released the single "Settle".

In September 2011, a new, updated recording of Shirley Bassey's 1960s classic "I (Who Have Nothing)" was released on iTunes and Amazon.

In 2013, Knight recorded the Lenny Kravitz–written and -produced song "You And I Ain't Nothin' No More" for the soundtrack from Lee Daniels' motion picture The Butler. The song was added to the movie's soundtrack of older songs with various artists so the producers could nominate it for Best Song from a Motion Picture category at the Academy Awards.

Where My Heart Belongs (2014) marked her 30th top-40 R&B album, including work by Gladys Knight & the Pips. In a 2014 interview, she expressed a hope that women would "Stand Up" and stop selling sex in the music/entertainment industry. She commented that the growing trend saddened her heart and that she had been taught to dress respectfully for her audiences ... "not take it off, put it on." Knight is ranked number eighteen on VH1 network's list of the 100 Greatest Women of Rock.

In 2019, Knight accepted an invitation to sing the national anthem at Super Bowl LIII. She faced criticism for agreeing to perform due to the alleged blacklisting of Colin Kaepernick by the National Football League after he began protesting police brutality during pre-game anthem ceremonies. Similar criticism was expressed against the half-time show performers, Maroon 5, Travis Scott, and Big Boi. Knight defended her decision to sing, claiming to understand Kaepernick's reasons for protesting but criticizing him for kneeling during the national anthem.

In 2019, Knight was invited to play at the 100th Anniversary of Delaware State Fair, located in Harrington, Delaware.

In 2022, Knight received Kennedy Center Honors, presented by U.S. President Joe Biden.  She also headlined a U.S.-Africa Leaders Summit Dinner at the White House.

UK Farewell Tour
In October 2009, Knight started her farewell tour of the United Kingdom which featured Tito Jackson as her supporting act and special appearances by Dionne Warwick.

The UK Farewell Tour featured higher production values than previous "Gladys Knight, a mic and a light" appearances by Knight in the UK. A glossy program was available and the show featured pre-produced animation on large on-stage screens. The tour was promoted by an appearance on the TV program Later... with Jools Holland where Knight performed "If I Were Your Woman" and "Help Me Make It Through the Night".

In spite of her "farewell", Knight started touring the UK again a few years later, playing gigs in Scotland and England in 2015, 2016, 2017, 2019 and 2022.

Acting

Film
In 1976, Knight made her acting debut as the lead in the film Pipe Dreams for which she was nominated for a Golden Globe Award for New Star of the Year – Actress. In 2003, she had a small role in the movie Hollywood Homicide, which starred Harrison Ford and Josh Hartnett. In 2009, Knight was featured in Tyler Perry's I Can Do Bad All by Myself, the film version of a play he had dramatized, and performed her song "The Need To Be" from the 1974 album I Feel a Song.

Television
In 1975, Knight starred in a variety show, The Gladys Knight and the Pips Show, which was canceled after four episodes. She also guest-starred on several TV series throughout the 1980s and 1990s, appearing on Benson, The Jeffersons, A Different World, Living Single, The Jamie Foxx Show, and New York Undercover. In 1985, she co-starred on the CBS sitcom Charlie & Co., alongside comedian Flip Wilson, which lasted for one season.

In April 2005, she portrayed a singer in an episode of JAG. In April 2009, she made a special guest appearance, and performed a song, on Tyler Perry's House of Payne. Knight has also made a number of cameo appearances, including on Las Vegas and 30 Rock. In 2012, she began a recurring role in the syndicated sitcom The First Family.

In 2012, Knight competed on season 14 of Dancing with the Stars, partnered with Tristan MacManus. They were eliminated on April 24 after losing a "dance duel" to Disney Channel star Roshon Fegan and partner Chelsie Hightower, ironically on the show's "Motown Week".

In 2017, she appeared as herself in the musical-drama TV series Star.

In 2018, she played Ella Grover, mother of Captain Lou Grover, in the "Lele pū nā manu like" ("Birds of a Feather...") episode of Hawaii Five-0, which first aired on November 16, 2018.

In February 2019, she was revealed to have competed as "Bee" on  The Masked Singer, in which she placed third. She performed "Chandelier", "Locked Out of Heaven", "Wrecking Ball", "What's Love Got to Do with It", "(You Make Me Feel Like) A Natural Woman", and "I Can't Make You Love Me". She finished behind Donny Osmond as "Peacock" and T-Pain as "Monster".

Gladys Knight & Ron Winans Chicken & Waffles

Knight's son Shanga Hankerson owns a chain of chicken and waffles restaurants based in Atlanta, bearing her name. Gladys Knight & Ron Winans' Chicken & Waffles currently have three locations in the Atlanta area. One location was featured on the Travel Channel original series Man v. Food. In June 2016, authorities in Georgia raided two of the restaurants and its headquarters.

WSB-TV reported that Shanga is at the center of an investigation involving unpaid taxes, penalties and interest. Georgia Department of Revenue Special Investigations Chief Jeff Mitchell told the station that the investigation solely involved Hankerson and not Knight. "Shanga's accused of stealing over $650,000 in both sales and withholding tax", Josh Waites, a special investigator, told WSB-TV. "[With] penalties and interest, it's up to over $1 million owed."

Personal life

Knight has been married four times and has three children. At 16 years old, she became pregnant and married Atlanta musician and classmate James "Jimmy" Newman in 1960. She had a miscarriage; the couple went on to have two children. Newman became a drug addict and abandoned the family when Knight was 20. They remained married for over 12 years until 1973. Their son, James "Jimmy" Gaston Newman III was born on August 13, 1962. She retired from the road to raise their child while the Pips toured on their own. In November 1963, Knight had her only daughter, Kenya Maria Newman. Later she returned to recording with the Pips in order to support her family.

In the early 1960s, Gladys, James, and the Pips moved to Detroit. Knight and her family lived on Sherbourne Road in Sherwood Forest, an upscale neighborhood on Detroit's West Side. She resided on LaSalle Avenue for a time. Her children attended Gesu Catholic Grade School. After being separated seven years, Knight divorced Newman in 1973, and he died a few years later. 

In 1974, Knight married Barry Hankerson, who created Blackground Records, the label that signed his niece, the R&B singer Aaliyah, to a record deal, in Detroit. The couple had one son, Shanga Ali Hankerson, born on August 1, 1976.  Around 1977, they relocated to Atlanta. The Pips remained in Detroit. Their marriage ended in 1979 with a prolonged custody battle over their son. Knight spent over a million dollars looking for her son after he was kidnapped. 

In 1995, Knight married motivational speaker Les Brown, but they separated and divorced in 1997.

Knight suffered through a gambling addiction that lasted more than a decade. In the late 1980s, after losing $60,000 in one night at the baccarat table, she joined Gamblers Anonymous, which helped her quit the habit.

Previously a Baptist and later a Catholic, in 1997 she was baptized into the Church of Jesus Christ of Latter-day Saints, following her son and daughter leaving Catholicism to join. She had occasionally teased LDS president Gordon B. Hinckley, saying his flock needed to inject some "pep" into their music. He agreed, which resulted in the Grammy Award-winning Saints Unified Voices gospel music choir being formed. Knight later led the Be One Choir at "Be One 40th Anniversary Celebration of the Revelation on the Priesthood."

Knight's son Jimmy Newman managed her career through his Newman Management Inc. until his death from heart failure on July 10, 1999, at age 36. Newman was survived by his wife, Michelene; daughters Nastasia and Gabrielle; and sons Rishawn, Stefan, and Sterling.

Knight married William McDowell in 2001. They have seventeen grandchildren and ten great-grandchildren between them. Knight and McDowell reside in Fairview, North Carolina, near where they own a community center, the former Reynolds High School in Asheville attended by McDowell.

In 2017, Knight helped raise $400,000 for the Children's Learning Centers of Fairfield County. The event was held at the Palace Theatre and was co-hosted by Carol Anne Riddell and Alan Kalter.

Legacy
In 1996, Gladys Knight & the Pips were inducted into the Rock and Roll Hall of Fame. One year before, Knight had received a star on the Hollywood Walk of Fame. In 2007, Knight received the Society of Singers ELLA Award at which time she was declared the "Empress of Soul". She is listed on Rolling Stones list of the Greatest Singers of All Time.  In 2022, Knight received Kennedy Center Honors.

Discography

Studio albums
 Miss Gladys Knight (1978)
 Gladys Knight (1979)
 Good Woman (1991)
 Just for You (1994)
 Many Different Roads (1998)
 At Last (2000)
 One Voice (with Saints Unified Voices) (2005)
 Before Me (2006)
 Another Journey (2013)
 Where My Heart Belongs (2014)

Published works
 Knight, Gladys. At Home With Gladys Knight, McGraw-Hill, 2001 – 
 Knight, Gladys. Between Each Line of Pain and Glory: My Life Story, Hyperion Press, 1998 –

Filmography

Films

Television

Awards, honors, and achievements

Grammy Awards
Knight has won seven Grammys with twenty-two nominations altogether.

|-
| 1967
| "I Heard It Through The Grapevine" (award for Knight, performance by Gladys Knight & the Pips)
| Best Female R&B Vocal Performance
| 
|-
| 1969
| "Friendship Train" (Gladys Knight & the Pips)
| Best R&B Performance by a Duo or Group with Vocals
| 
|-
| 1971
| "If I Were Your Woman" (Gladys Knight & the Pips)
| Best R&B Performance by a Duo or Group with Vocals
| 
|-
| 1972
| "Help Me Make It Through the Night" (Gladys Knight & the Pips)
| Best R&B Performance by a Duo or Group with Vocals
| 
|-
| rowspan=2|1973
| "Neither One of Us (Wants to Be the First to Say Goodbye)" (Gladys Knight & the Pips)
| Best Pop Performance by a Duo or Group with Vocals
| 
|-
| "Midnight Train To Georgia" (Gladys Knight & the Pips)
| Best R&B Performance by a Duo or Group with Vocals
| 
|-
| 1974
| "I Feel A Song (In My Heart)" (Gladys Knight & the Pips)
| Best R&B Performance by a Duo or Group with Vocals
| 
|-
| 1975
| "The Way We Were"/"Try to Remember" (Gladys Knight & the Pips)
| Best Pop Performance by a Duo or Group with Vocals
| 
|-
| 1977
| "Baby Don't Change Your Mind" (Gladys Knight & the Pips)
| Best R&B Performance by a Duo or Group with Vocals
| 
|-
| 1980
| About Love (Gladys Knight & the Pips)
| Best R&B Performance by a Duo or Group with Vocals
| 
|-
| rowspan=2|1986
| "That's What Friends Are For" (Dionne Warwick, Elton John, Gladys Knight & Stevie Wonder)
| Best Pop Performance by a Duo or Group With Vocals
| 
|-
| "That's What Friends Are For" (Dionne Warwick, Elton John, Gladys Knight & Stevie Wonder)
| Record of the Year
| 
|-
| 1988
| "Love Overboard" (Gladys Knight And the Pips)
| Best R&B Performance by a Duo or Group With Vocals
| 
|-
| rowspan=2|1991
| "Superwoman" (Gladys Knight, Patti LaBelle & Dionne Warwick)
| Best R&B Performance by a Duo or Group with Vocals
| 
|-
| Good Woman
| Best R&B Vocal Performance, Female
| 
|-
| rowspan=2|1994
| Just for You
| Best R&B Album
| 
|-
| "I Don't Want to Know"
| Best R&B Vocal Performance, Female
| 
|- 
| 1996
| "Missing You" (Brandy, Tamia, Gladys Knight & Chaka Khan)
| Best Pop Collaboration with Vocals
| 
|-
| 1999
| Many Different Roads
| Best Contemporary Soul Gospel Album
| 
|- 
| 2001
| At Last
| Best Traditional R&B Vocal Album
| 
|-
| 2004
| "Heaven Help Us All" (Gladys Knight & Ray Charles)
| Best Gospel Performance
| 
|-
| 2005
| One Voice (Gladys Knight & Saints Unified Voices)
| Best Gospel Choir or Chorus Album
|

Other awards and honors
 1992: Essence Award for Career Achievement
 1995: Hollywood Walk of Fame
 1996: Rock and Roll Hall of Fame
 1997: Trumpet Awards Foundation Pinnacle Award
 2005: BET Lifetime Achievement Award
 2007: NAACP Image Award for Outstanding Jazz Artist
 2007: Society of Singers Ella Award, also declared the "Empress of Soul"
 2008: BET Inaugural Best Living Legend Award
 2008: National Black Arts Festival Honoree at Legends Celebration
 2011: Soul Train Music Awards Lifetime Achievement Award
 2017: National Rhythm & Blues Hall of Fame
 2019: Golden Plate Award of the American Academy of Achievement
 2022: 45th Annual Kennedy Center Honors

Honorary degrees
 Honorary Doctorate in Performing Arts, Shaw University

References

External links

 
 
 

1944 births
21st-century American singers
21st-century American women singers
African-American Latter Day Saints
African-American actresses
20th-century African-American women singers
American Latter Day Saints
American contraltos
American film actresses
American soul singers
American television actresses
Ballad musicians
Converts to Mormonism
Converts to Mormonism from Roman Catholicism
Gladys Knight & the Pips members
Grammy Award winners
Knight family (show business)
Latter Day Saints from Georgia (U.S. state)
Latter Day Saints from North Carolina
Living people
Musicians from Atlanta
Participants in American reality television series
Singers from Georgia (U.S. state)
Vee-Jay Records artists
Writers from Georgia (U.S. state)
21st-century African-American women
Kennedy Center honorees
Former Roman Catholics